The Logans Ferry Mine Tunnel consists of a pair of abandoned coal tunnels under the Allegheny River between Plum and Springdale, Pennsylvania in the United States.

History
In 1919, West Penn Power acquired the land to build a power facility in Springdale, but did not have an adequate coal source. As a result, they leased coal-rich land on the opposite shore of the river. To simplify transport issues, the decision was made to build the mine tunnel, which opened in 1921. By the 1940s, the mine's resources started to be depleted and West Penn, which had constructed the neighborhood of Logan Heights (which today looks unlike most of the 1960s-or-later suburban stock that dominates Plum), transformed from being a company town to a community of homeowners. However, in 1968, the mine was closed permanently, and the tunnels are presumed to be currently flooded.

References

Tunnels in Pennsylvania
Tunnels completed in 1921
FirstEnergy
Crossings of the Allegheny River
Tunnels in Allegheny County, Pennsylvania
Mining in Pennsylvania
Coal mining in the United States
1921 establishments in Pennsylvania